The Tareq Rajab Museum is located in Kuwait and houses an extensive collection of artefacts accumulated over a fifty-year period commencing in the 1950s. The Museum is housed at two separate locations in Jabriya, Kuwait. The Tareq Rajab Museum, which was founded in 1980, and the Tareq Rajab Museum of Islamic Calligraphy in 2007. The Tareq Rajab museum includes collections of manuscripts and miniatures, ceramics, metalwork, glass, arms and armour as well as textiles, costumes and jewellery. The museum's ceramics collection is very large and comprehensive, and includes objects from pre-Islamic times up to the early 20th century and from across the breadth of the Islamic world. The museum houses one of the foremost collections of silver jewellery as well as a fine collection of gold jewellery much of which dates from pre-Islamic times. There is a large collection of Qurans and manuscripts from all periods, with the earliest dating to the 7th century AD and from across the whole Islamic world. From important Qurans such as an Uljaytu volume, to rare manuscripts such as the Al-Kindi book on optics, the range of works is comprehensive and representative of many styles and regions.

History

Tareq & Jehan S. Rajab

Iraqi Invasion and Occupation of Kuwait (1990-1991)

Post Invasion & the Tareq Rajab Museum today

Collections

The Tareq Rajab Museum

Manuscripts & Calligraphy

The Gold Room

Ceramics

Arms & Armour

Glass

Metalwork

Silver Jewellery

Orientalist Artwork

Textiles, Embroideries & Costumes

Musical Instruments

The Tareq Rajab Museum of Islamic Calligraphy

Holy Coverings

Chinese Islamic Calligraphy

Manuscripts

The Hilya Room

Contemporary Calligraphy

References

External links 
 

1980 establishments in Kuwait
Museums established in 1980
Buildings and structures in Kuwait City
Museums in Kuwait
Islamic museums
Cultural centers in Kuwait
Art museums and galleries in Kuwait